Dora Old Elk (born 1977) is an Apsáalooke (Crow/Absaroke)/Sioux artist who grew up on the Crow Indian Reservation in Billings, Montana.  A dance dress made by Dora Old Elk is in the permanent collection of the National Museum of the American Indian in Washington, D.C. She also dances Women's Northern Traditional dance. Of her dance dresses she has said, 'I see my outfit as an individual itself. When I put it on, there's no other way to really represent myself than to be out there and dancing. It feels really, really good. It's like nothing that I've ever felt before.' She was a member of the Baptist Ladies' Sewing group as a child in the 1940s, as was her mother Evelyn Old Elk.

The band Warscout recorded a Pow Wow song "Apsaalooke Double Beat" for Old Elk in 2008.

References

Native American artists
1977 births
Living people
Native American women artists
20th-century Native American women
20th-century Native Americans
21st-century Native American women
21st-century Native Americans
20th-century American women artists
21st-century American women artists
People from Billings, Montana
Artists from Montana
Native American dancers
Dancers from Montana
20th-century American dancers
21st-century American dancers